Leonel Antonio Parris Mitre (born 13 June 1982) is a Panamanian footballer who plays as a right-back for Tauro.

Club career
He played for Plaza Amador and Chorrillo before moving to Tauro in 2009.

In June 2014, he moved abroad to join Colombian side Uniautónoma, but he was released in January 2015.

International career
Parris made his debut for Panama in an May 2005friendly match against Venezuela and has, as of June 2015, earned a total of 25 caps, scoring no goals. He represented his country in 6 FIFA World Cup qualification matches and was a member of the squad at the 2013 CONCACAF Gold Cup where Panama finished runners-up.

References

External links
 

1982 births
Living people
Association football defenders
Panamanian footballers
Panama international footballers
2013 Copa Centroamericana players
2013 CONCACAF Gold Cup players
Categoría Primera A players
C.D. Plaza Amador players
Unión Deportivo Universitario players
Tauro F.C. players
Uniautónoma F.C. footballers
Panamanian expatriate footballers
Expatriate footballers in Colombia